Badeau is a surname. Notable people with the surname include:

Adam Badeau (1831–1895), American author, Union Army officer, and diplomat
John S. Badeau (1903–1995), American diplomat, engineer, minister, and scholar

See also
 Badea (disambiguation)
 Badeaux

French-language surnames